Current Island is an island in the Bahamas, located in the district of North Eleuthera. The island had a population of 38 at the 2010 census. The island is separated from the island of North Eleuthera by a channel known as the Current Cut, which is a site used for diving.

Bird species found on the island include the Bahama swallow (callichelidon cyaneoviridis), black-whiskered vireo (vireosylva calidris barbaiula), the Bahama bananaquit (coereba bahamensis) the Bahama ground dove (columbigallina passerina bahamensis), and the Bahaman bullfinch (pyrrhulagra violacea).

References

Islands of the Bahamas